The 2003 Norwegian Figure Skating Championships was held at the Tønsberg Ishall in Tønsberg from January 17 to 19, 2003. Skaters competed in the discipline of single skating. The results were used to choose the teams to the 2003 World Championships, the 2003 European Championships, the 2003 Nordic Championships, and the 2003 World Junior Championships.

Senior results

Ladies

Junior results

Men

Ladies

References

External links
 
 results 

Norwegian Figure Skating Championships
Norwegian Figure Skating Championships, 2003
2003 in Norwegian sport